Marc-André Dalbavie (born 10 February 1961 at Neuilly-sur-Seine, France) is a French composer. He had his first music lessons at age 6. He attended the Conservatoire de Paris, where he studied composition with Marius Constant and orchestration with Pierre Boulez. In 1985 he joined the research department of IRCAM where he studied digital synthesis, computer assisted composition and spectral analysis. In the early 1990s he moved to Berlin. Currently he lives in the town of St. Cyprien and teaches orchestration at the Conservatoire de Paris.

In 1994 he was awarded the Rome Prize. The same year he was one of three composers who won the Ernst von Siemens Composers' Prize. In 1998, the Cleveland Orchestra appointed him the composer-in-residence (a Daniel Lewis Fellow) for two years. In 2004, he was made a Chevalier des Arts et Lettres by the French Ministry of Culture. In 2018 he was awarded the Chamber Music Society of Lincoln Center's Elise L. Stoeger Prize.

Selected works

Orchestral
 Les miroirs transparents (1986)
 Concertino (1994)
 The Dream of the Unified Space, concerto for orchestra (1999)
 Concertate il suono (2000)
 Color (2001)
 Ciaccona (2002)
 Palimpseste (2002)
 Rocks under the Water (2002)
 Sinfonietta (2005)
 Variations orchestrales (2006)
 La source d'un regard (2007)
 Melodia (2008)

Concertante
 Diadèmes for viola solo, instrumental ensemble and electronic ensemble (1986)
 Violin Concerto (1996)
 Antiphonie, double concerto for clarinet, basset horn and orchestra (1999)
 La marche des transitoires for oboe and ensemble (2005)
 Piano Concerto (2005)
 Flute Concerto (2006)
 Concertino for Piano and String Orchestra (2007)
 Fantaisies for cello and ensemble (2008–09)
 Oboe Concerto (2009–10)
 Cello Concerto (2013)
 Vivaldi Fantasie for violin and orchestra or ensemble (2013)

Chamber
 Les paradis mécaniques for piccolo, flute, two clarinets, two trumpets, horn, two trombones, tuba and piano (1986)
 Élégie for flute solo (1990)
 Petit interlude for tuba or bass saxhorn solo (1992)
 Petit interlude for viola and piano (1992)
 In Advance of the Broken Time for flute, clarinet, violin, viola, cello and piano (1994)
 Tactus for clarinet, bassoon, horn, string quintet and piano (1996)
 Palimpseste, sextet for flute, clarinet, violin, viola, cello and piano (2002)
 Axiom, quartet for clarinet, bassoon, trumpet and piano (2004)
 Trio for violin, horn and piano (2005)
 Chant Récitation Danse for six percussionists (2007)
 Piano trio No. 1 (for piano, violin, and cello) (2008)
 Interlude for solo cello (2010)
 Piano Quartet (for piano, violin, viola, and cello) (2012)
 Quatuor à cordes (2012)
 Nocturne (for flute and piano) (2012)

Vocal
 Seuils for soprano, orchestra and electronics (1991)
 Correspondances for soprano, alto, baritone, chamber ensemble and electronics (1997)
 Sextine Cyclus for soprano and chamber orchestra (2000)
 Ligne de fuite for solo voice (2001); words by 
  Double Jeu for soprano and two ensembles (2003); text by Ezra Pound
 Sonnets sur un poème de Louise Labé for countertenor and orchestra (2008)
 Trois Chansons Populaires for voice and orchestra (2013)
 Trois mélodies pour voix et piano (2013)

Choral
 Instances for chorus (12 voices) and orchestra (1989)
 Offertoire for male chorus and orchestra (1995, for the Requiem of Reconciliation)
 Non-lieu for four groups of female chorus and ensemble (1997)
 Mobiles for chorus and orchestra (2001); words by Guy Lelong
 Chants for six men's voices, with percussion, harp, and piano (2003)
 Comptines for children's chorus, harp, piano, and percussion (2005)

Operas
 Gesualdo (premiered in Zürich in 2010)
 Charlotte Salomon (Salzburg Festival, 28 July 2014)

Notes

External links 
 

20th-century classical composers
21st-century classical composers
French classical composers
French male classical composers
Living people
1961 births
Chevaliers of the Ordre des Arts et des Lettres
International Rostrum of Composers prize-winners
Ernst von Siemens Composers' Prize winners
20th-century French composers
21st-century French composers
20th-century French male musicians
21st-century French male musicians
People from Neuilly-sur-Seine